The RheinMain University of Applied Sciences (German: Hochschule RheinMain), formerly University of Applied Sciences Wiesbaden (German: Fachhochschule Wiesbaden),  is a university located in Wiesbaden, Germany, founded in 1971. It is part of the IT-Cluster Rhine-Main-Neckar, the "Silicon Valley of Europe".

History

The University of Applied Sciences Wiesbaden (German: Fachhochschule Wiesbaden) was founded in 1971. On 1 September 2009 it was renamed RheinMain University of Applied Sciences.

The former Geisenheim campus became a separate university in 2013.

Description
RheinMain University of Applied Sciences is part of the IT-Cluster Rhine-Main-Neckar, the "Silicon Valley of Europe".

Study programs are divided into the following faculties:
Faculty of Applied Social Sciences
Faculty of Architecture and Civil Engineering
Faculty of Design – Computer Science – Media
Faculty of Engineering
Wiesbaden Business School

The faculties of Social Sciences, Architecture and Civil Engineering, Design – Computer Science - Media, and the Wiesbaden Business School are located in Wiesbaden. The Faculty of Engineering is situated nearby Rüsselsheim.

As of 2019 more than 14,000 students were studying at RheinMain University of Applied Sciences: About 10,600 in Wiesbaden and about 3,500 in Rüsselsheim. They are enrolled in about 70 different degree programs, including part-time and cooperative, distance learning and master's programs.

In 2011 the university had about 900 employees.

Campuses

The campuses of the RheinMain University of Applied Sciences are located in the Rhein Main area, in the west of Germany.

Wiesbaden

The study location Wiesbaden consists of three campuses.

 Kurt-Schumacher-Ring
At the Kurt-Schumacher-Ring campus the Faculty of Architecture and Civil Engineering and the Faculty of Applied Social Sciences can be found.

 Bleichstraße/Bertramstraße
The Bleichstraße/Bertramstraße campus is an inner city campus in Wiesbaden. The Wiesbaden Business School is situated there as well as a specialized library.

 Unter den Eichen
The Faculty of Design, Computer Science and Media is situated on this campus.

Rüsselsheim
 Am Brückweg

The Faculty of Engineering is based in Rüsselsheim on the campus Am Brückweg.

Partner institutions
The university has a number of partner universities in many countries, including Australia, China, Korea, Latvia, Mexico and Turkey.

See also

 Fachhochschule
 List of colleges and universities

References

Education in Wiesbaden
Universities and colleges in Hesse
 
Universities of Applied Sciences in Germany